The Pötenitzer Wiek (also called Traveförde) is an eastern bay of the lower Trave east of the Priwall Peninsula, Germany. The bay is in Schleswig-Holstein while the bank partly forms the border with Mecklenburg-Vorpommern. Until the Second World War, the Pötenitzer Wiek was a take-off and landing location for domestic  seaplanes and functioned as the airport at that time for the Priwall airbase Luftwaffe. The name is due to the Mecklenburgian locality of Pötenitz, which belonged to the town of Dassow.

Bays of Mecklenburg-Western Pomerania
Bays of Schleswig-Holstein
Lübeck
0PotenitzerWiek